Paolo Mannucci (born 9 February 1942) is an Italian former racing cyclist. He finished in last place in the 1966 Tour de France.

References

External links
 

1942 births
Living people
Italian male cyclists
Place of birth missing (living people)
Sportspeople from the Metropolitan City of Florence
Cyclists from Tuscany